The Sound Pattern of English (frequently referred to as SPE) is a 1968 work on phonology (a branch of linguistics) by Noam Chomsky and Morris Halle. In spite of its title, it presents not only a view of the phonology of English, but also contains discussions of a large variety of phonological phenomena of many other languages. The index lists about 100 such languages. It has been very influential in both the field of phonology and in the analysis of the English language. Chomsky and Halle present a view of phonology as a linguistic subsystem, separate from other components of the grammar, that transforms an underlying phonemic sequence according to rules and produces as its output the phonetic form that is uttered by a speaker. The theory fits with the rest of Chomsky's early theories of language in the sense that it is transformational; as such it serves as a landmark in Chomsky's theories by adding a clearly articulated theory of phonology to his previous work which focused on syntax.

Overview
The Sound Pattern of English has had some influence on subsequent work. Derivatives of the theory have made modifications by changing the inventory of segmental features, considering some to be absent rather than having a positive or negative value, or adding complexity to the linear, segmental structure assumed by Chomsky and Halle. Its treatment of phonology as rules that operate on features, as well as its particular feature scheme, survive in various altered forms in many current theories of phonology. Some major successor theories include autosegmental phonology, lexical phonology and optimality theory.

Chomsky and Halle represent speech sounds as bundles of plus-or-minus valued features (e.g. vocalic, high, back, anterior, nasal, etc.) The phonological component of each lexical entry is considered to be a linear sequence of these feature bundles. A number of context-sensitive rules transform the underlying form of a sequence of words into the final phonetic form that is uttered by the speaker. These rules are allowed access to the tree structure that the syntax is said to output. This access allows rules that apply, for example, only at the end of a word, or only at the end of a noun phrase.

The influence of SPE has led to rules of the form given in SPE, A→B / [precontext _ postcontext], often being called "SPE-style rules" or "SPE-type rules".

Editions
1968: Chomsky, Noam and Halle, Morris. The Sound Pattern of English. New York: Harper & Row.

Related works
 Goyvaerts, Didier L. and Pullum, Geoffrey K. (eds.) (1975) Essays on the Sound Pattern of English. Ghent: Editions Story-Scientia.
 Halle, Morris and Mohanan, K. P. (1985) "Segmental phonology of Modern English". Linguistic Inquiry; 16, 57–116.  
 Hayes, Bruce (1982) "Extrametricality and English stress". Linguistic Inquiry; 13, 227–76. 
 Ross, John Robert (1972) "A reanalysis of English word stress". In: Contributions to Generative Phonology, ed. Michael Brame, pp. 229–323. Austin, TX: University of Texas Press. 
 Stampe, David (1973) "On chapter nine". In: Issues in Phonological Theory, ed. Kenstowicz, Michael and Charles W. Kisseberth, pp. 44–52. The Hague: Mouton.

References

1968 non-fiction books
Books by Noam Chomsky
English phonology
English orthography
Cognitive science literature
Harper & Row books
Phonology books
Generative linguistics